Luo Xin (born 27 January 2000) is a Chinese footballer who plays as a defender for Shijiazhuang Gongfu, on loan from Chengdu Rongcheng.

Club career
In 2019, Luo signed for third tier Belgian side Tubize for the 2019–20 Belgian First Amateur Division campaign. He would make his debut in a league game on 31 August 2019 against Sint-Eloois-Winkel in a 0-0 draw. Before the 2020 season, he signed for Chengdu Rongcheng in the Chinese second division. On 12 September 2020, he debuted for Chengdu Rongcheng in a league game during a 3-2 win over Beijing Renhe.

In 2021, Luo was sent on loan to Chinese third division club Sichuan Minzu. This was followed by another loan, this time to a second tier club Shijiazhuang Gongfu for 2022 league campaign.

Career statistics
.

References

External links
 
 

Chinese footballers
Living people
2000 births
Association football defenders
Chinese expatriate footballers
Chinese expatriate sportspeople in Belgium
A.F.C. Tubize players
Belgian Third Division players
China League One players